Gbadebo is a Yoruba name meaning "the one who brings the crown" or "born with a crown".

Gbadebo as a first/given name 
 Gbadebo Rhodes-Vivour

Gbadebo as a last name 
 Adebayo Gbadebo
 Sampson Gbadebo
 Adedotun Aremu Gbadebo III
 Samuel Adesina Gbadebo

References 

Yoruba-language names